Oleh is the headquarters of the Isoko South Local Government Area, one of the two administrative units in the Isoko region of Delta State, southern Nigeria.

Politics and Government
As the administrative center for the local government, it houses the council offices.

The town is under the leadership of a monarch, His Royal Majesty (H.R.M.) Ovrawah A. Omogha 1  (JP) FCAI, who has the power to appoint his Kinsmen (also known as Chiefs) who assist him in decision(s) making relating to the affairs of Oleh community. In addition to the monarch and his chiefs, there is also an Oleh community executives headed by an elected president. Both the community executives and the king with his chiefs work together to see to the smooth running of the community affairs. They are also the traditional custodian of the people's customs and traditions. The monarch is influential in Isokoland in matters relating to his kingdom. He is also a member of the state council of traditional rulers, which also provides him a platform for some influence on statewide issues.

Economy
There are different economic classes in Oleh, ranging from civil servants, merchants, skilled and unskilled personnel and farmers. The farmers mostly specialize in food crop farming, fishery, livestock farming and sometimes hunting of bush animals. The food crops cultivated by the farmers include; cassava, maize, oil palms, plantain and yams. Women form a large proportion of the farming population. They also engage in trading of food crops for cash to meet other basic household needs. On market days, women can be seen peddling their assorted wares in the town markets. Cassava is the source of most of the foods consumed by the people. Garri, starch meal (Ozi), Egu are cassava derivatives.

Demographics
There is no definitive population census figure for Oleh and, indeed, all of Isoko.

Education
Oleh has several primary, secondary and one tertiary institutions. Some of its major government owned primary and secondary schools are: Isoko Central School, Evoja Primary School, Odoro Primary School, Owhara Primary School, Uzi Primary School, Emiye Girl's Grammar School, Emore Grammar School and Saint Michael's College. It also has the Oleh Campus (comprising Faculty of Law and Engineering) of Delta State University, ('Delta State University') with various private schools.

Flooding 
The community has, over the years, been faced with series of flooding crisis occasioned by the change in climate. In 2022, Oleh community in Isoko Local Government Area was hit with flood which led to loss of lives and properties. The effect of the 2022 flooding in Oleh also affected the economy of the community as vehicular movement was restricted within the community.

Notable people
Kenneth Ogba, politician

References

Populated places in Isoko South